Whetstone Creek may refer to:

Whetstone Creek (Gasconade River tributary), a stream in Missouri
Whetstone Creek (Loutre River tributary), a stream in Missouri
Whetstone Creek (Little Nottoway River tributary), a stream in Nottoway County, Virginia